Paraoxonases are a family of mammalian enzymes with aryldialkylphosphatase activity. There are three paraoxonase isozymes, which were originally discovered for their involvement in the hydrolysis of organophosphates.

Research has indicated the enzymatic activity of paraoxonases is more diversified than its activity as an organophosphatase. Esterase and lactonase activity has also been observed from these enzymes and though the physiologically relevant substrates for these enzymes are unknown, it is likely that lactones are the main substrate (although there is a relatively high level of variation in substrate specificity among these enzymes). Most of the studies on the paraoxonase family have specifically looked at the paraoxonase 1 type, leaving much to be learned about the remaining two.

The study of this enzyme family has many potential consequences in preventative medicine and toxicology as well as in certain societal contexts. The genes that encode for these enzymes have a number of different polymorphisms, which created additional interest in the study of this enzyme group and its potential ethnic variations. Additional research on the inhibition and selective inhibition, specifically of PON1, has been done to shed some light on the connections between decreases in enzymatic activity of individuals with cardiovascular diseases. Evidence also suggests that this family of enzymes has some role in our innate immune system.

Types
There are three known paraoxonases, which are encoded by the genes PON1, PON2 and PON3, located on the long arm of chromosome 7 in humans. The differences between them lie in their locations and activities.
 Paraoxonase 1 has gene expression primarily in the liver but has also been expressed in tissue from the kidney and parts of the colon. Paraoxonase 1 that is synthesized in the liver is then transported into the bloodstream, where it will associate with high-density lipoprotein (HDL). It has been shown to have broad substrate specificity and has proved to protect against exposure to some organophosphates (such as those from insecticides) by hydrolyzing potentially toxic metabolites. Paraoxonase 1 also plays an important role as an antioxidant in preventing the oxidation of low-density lipoproteins (LDL), a process that is directly involved in the development of atherosclerosis. Its serum concentration is influenced by inflammatory changes and the levels of serum oxidised-LDL.
 Paraoxonase 2 is a ubiquitously expressed intracellular protein that can protect cells against oxidative damage. While paraoxonase 2 shares similar antioxidant properties with its two enzyme counterparts, it lacks the ability to hydrolyze some of the organophosphate metabolites.
 Paraoxonase 3 is similar to type 1 in activity but differs from it in substrate specificity. Serum PON3 activity is one hundredth that of PON1. Additionally, it is not regulated by inflammation and levels of oxidised lipids. Both paraoxonase 1 and 3 are bound to HDL and because of their similar properties as antioxidants, it is possible PON3 also plays a role in the prevention of LDL and HDL oxidation.

Biological function 
Paraoxonases have been found to perform a number of biological functions, though the primary role of this group of enzymes is still a topic of speculation. Some of the observed roles have revealed activities of anti-inflammatory, anti-oxidative, anti-atherogenic, anti-diabetic, anti-microbial and organophosphate-hydrolyzing properties. Two of the most important known roles that Paraoxonases plays are in functioning as a lactonase and an arylesterase. These properties provide a promising potential for development of new therapeutic interventions to combat a number of health conditions.

Mechanism 

The study of this family of enzymes has been something of interest for a number of years now; however, the lack of identifying specific natural substrates and numerous physiological roles has made it difficult in determining mechanisms of action for the diverse number of reactions catalyzed by this enzyme family. One of the more studied mechanisms is the lactonase mechanism of Serum Paraoxonase-1. One of the proposed mechanism outlines the hydrolysis of 5-membered ring lactone substrates by serum Paraoxonase-1. PON1, as with PON2 and PON3, utilizes a catalytic calcium ion, which functions as an oxy-anion to stabilize substrate and reaction states. Additionally, this enzyme active site employs two histidine residues (His115 and 134) involved in proton transfers, a glutamic acid (Glu53) to stabilize reactive hydrogens, and an asparagine (Asn168) to stabilize transition states and intermediates in the active site. The exact mechanism is still a subject of further research and it is suggested that the His115 residue is not necessary for the lactonase and arylesterase activity of the enzyme.

Regulation 
One of the common inhibitors of enzymatic activity (for PON 1 and PON 3) is lipid peroxides found in the plasma. Lipid peroxides can inhibit Paraoxonase activity as an arylesterase and antioxidant, though the specific inhibition is dependent on the type of lipid head group. An important implication of this fact is that, in decreasing the activity of PON1 and PON3, the productivity of preventing oxidation of LDL. Enzyme activity is also regulated by a substrate-dependent polymorphism that occurs at position 192. There are two known isoforms, one having an arginine residue at the 192 position and the other a glutamine, which are associated with high and low enzymatic activity respectively.

Clinical significance
The development of atherosclerosis is a complex process, though the main underlying feature is simply an increase in low-density lipoprotein (LDL) oxidation.  PON1 and PON3 prevent the formation of atherogenic oxidised-LDL, the form of LDL present in foam cells of an atheromatous plaque. Because of their know association with high-density lipoprotein (HDL) and their effect on oxidized-LDL, PON1 and PON3 are implicated in lowering the risk of developing coronary artery disease and atherosclerosis.

History
PON was identified as an enzyme having organophosphates as its substrates. Reports of the geographic differences in population frequencies of paraoxonase activity and genetic analysis led to uncovering the genetic polymorphism. The name paraoxonase was given because of its ability to hydrolyze paraoxon, a toxic metabolite that comes from pesticide parathion.

The 3D crystal structure of PON1 was determined in 2004.

References

External links
 

EC 3.1
Protein families